Campas may refer to:
 Asháninka, or Campas, an ethnic group of the Amazon
 Yori Boy Campas, Mexican boxer

See also 
 Compas (disambiguation)
 CANPASS